The Philadelphia Phillies are a Major League Baseball team based in Philadelphia, Pennsylvania. They  are a member of the Eastern Division of Major League Baseball's National League. The team has played officially under two names since beginning play in 1883: the current moniker, as well as the "Quakers", which was used in conjunction with "Phillies" during the team's early history. The team was also known unofficially as the "Blue Jays" during the World War II era. Since the franchise's inception,  players have made an appearance in a competitive game for the team, whether as an offensive player (batting and baserunning) or a defensive player (fielding, pitching, or both).

Of those  Phillies, 99 have had surnames beginning with the letter D. Two of those players have been inducted into the Baseball Hall of Fame: outfielder Ed Delahanty, who played two stints for Philadelphia—from 1888 to 1889, and again from 1891 to 1901; and outfielder Hugh Duffy, who was a Phillie for three seasons (1904–1906) after being out of the major leagues for two years. The Hall of Fame lists the Phillies as Delahanty's primary team, and he is a member of the Philadelphia Baseball Wall of Fame, as is catcher Darren Daulton. Delahanty holds two franchise records, amassing 442 doubles and 157 triples to lead all Phillies in those categories. Pitcher Bill Duggleby also holds a record; he hit 81 batters in his eight-year career in Philadelphia.

Among the 60 batters in this list, outfielder Vern Duncan's .417 batting average is the highest mark; he amassed five hits in twelve plate appearances with Philadelphia. Other players with an average above .300 include Dick Davis (.311 in two seasons), Kiddo Davis (.302 in two seasons), Spud Davis (.321 in eight seasons), Delahanty (.348 in eleven seasons), Alexander Donoghue (.318 in one season), and George Durning (.357 in one season). Daulton's 134 home runs and Delahanty's 1,288 runs batted in lead all players whose surnames begin with D.

Of this list's 40 pitchers, Valerio de los Santos and Robert Dodd share the best win–loss record by winning percentage; each won one game while losing none. Duggleby's 90 wins and 99 losses are most among the members of this list, as are his 445 strikeouts. Dave Downs' 2.74 earned run average (ERA) in the only season of his career is the best mark in that category. Red Donahue is one of the ten Phillies pitchers who have thrown a no-hitter, accomplishing the feat on July 8, 1898.

One player, Ed Daily, has made 30% or more of his Phillies appearances as a pitcher and a position player. He amassed a 42–36 pitching record with a 2.77 ERA while batting .230 with six home runs as an outfielder.

Footnotes
Key
 The National Baseball Hall of Fame and Museum determines which cap a player wears on their plaque, signifying "the team with which he made his most indelible mark". The Hall of Fame considers the player's wishes in making their decision, but the Hall makes the final decision as "it is important that the logo be emblematic of the historical accomplishments of that player's career".
 Players are listed at a position if they appeared in 30% of their games or more during their Phillies career, as defined by Baseball-Reference. Additional positions may be shown on the Baseball-Reference website by following each player's citation.
 Franchise batting and pitching leaders are drawn from Baseball-Reference. A total of 1,500 plate appearances are needed to qualify for batting records, and 500 innings pitched or 50 decisions are required to qualify for pitching records.
 Statistics are correct as of the end of the 2010 Major League Baseball season.

See also
 Mahlon Duckett, who was drafted by the Phillies at the age of 85 as part of the 2008 special Negro leagues draft, but did not play any games

References
General

Inline citations

D